Xining (108) is a Type 051 destroyer of the People's Liberation Army Navy.

Development and design 
Work resumed in 1965 with nine ships being ordered. Construction started in 1968, with trials beginning in 1971. The ships nominally entered service in the early 1970s, but few were fully operational before 1985; workmanship was poor due to the Cultural Revolution.

Construction of the second batch began in 1977, with the last commissioning in 1991. The second batch may have been ordered due to the Cultural Revolution disrupting development of a successor class. These ships may be designated  Type 051D. The PLAN initiated an abortive modernization program for the first batch in 1982. The ships would be reconstructed with British weapons and sensors acquired from British Aerospace. The Falklands War made the prospective upgrades less impressive and cost effective, and the project was cancelled in 1984. A 1986 upgrade project using American power plants, weapons, sensors, and computers was cancelled because of the 1989 Tiananmen Square protests.

Construction and career 
Xining was launched on 16 October 1978 at the Luda Shipyard in Shanghai. Commissioned on 29 January 1980.

She was decommissioned on 25 September 2013 and currently she lies at Taizhou Naval Museum, Taizhou as a museum ship near the Taizhou Yangtze River Bridge.

References 

1978 ships
Ships built in China
Type 051 destroyers
Museum ships in China
Cold War destroyers of the People's Republic of China